St. Vladimir Cathedral or St. Volodymyr Cathedral may refer to:

St. Volodymyr's Ukrainian Orthodox Cathedral (Toronto), Canada
St. Vladimir's Cathedral, Paris, France
St. Vladimir's Cathedral (Saint Petersburg), Russia
St. Vladimir's Cathedral, Chersonesus, Ukraine
St Volodymyr's Cathedral, Kyiv, Ukraine
St. Vladimir's Cathedral, Sevastopol, Ukraine
St. Vladimir's Cathedral (Stamford, Connecticut), United States

See also
St Vladimir's Church, Moscow, Russia